In computer science, the longest common prefix array (LCP array) is an auxiliary data structure to the suffix array. It stores the lengths of the longest common prefixes (LCPs) between all pairs of consecutive suffixes in a sorted suffix array.

For example, if A := [aab, ab, abaab, b, baab] is a suffix array, the longest common prefix between A[1] = aab and A[2] = ab is a which has length 1, so H[2] = 1 in the LCP array H. Likewise, the LCP of A[2] = ab and A[3] = abaab is ab, so H[3] = 2.

Augmenting the suffix array with the LCP array allows one to efficiently simulate top-down and bottom-up traversals of the suffix tree, speeds up pattern matching on the suffix array and is a prerequisite for compressed suffix trees.

History 
The LCP array was introduced in 1993, by Udi Manber and Gene Myers alongside the suffix array in order to improve the running time of their string search algorithm.

Definition 
Let  be the suffix array of the string  of length , where  is a sentinel letter that is unique and lexicographically smaller than any other character.

Thus  stores the length of longest common prefix of the lexicographically th smallest suffix and its predecessor in the suffix array.

Difference between LCP array and suffix array:

 Suffix array: Represents the lexicographic rank of each suffix of an array.
 LCP array: Contains the maximum length prefix match between two consecutive suffixes, after they are sorted lexicographically.

Example 
Consider the string :

and its corresponding sorted suffix array  :

Suffix array with suffixes written out underneath vertically:

Then the LCP array  is constructed by comparing lexicographically consecutive suffixes to determine their longest common prefix:

Note that  is undefined, since there is no lexicographically smaller suffix.

Efficient construction algorithms 
LCP array construction algorithms can be divided into two different categories: algorithms that compute the LCP array as a byproduct to the suffix array and algorithms that use an already constructed suffix array in order to compute the LCP values.

 provide an algorithm to compute the LCP array alongside the suffix array in  time.  show that it is also possible to modify their  time algorithm such that it computes the LCP array as well.   present the first  time algorithm (FLAAP) that computes the LCP array given the text and the suffix array.

Assuming that each text symbol takes one byte and each entry of the suffix or LCP array takes 4 bytes, the major drawback of their algorithm is a large space occupancy of  bytes, while the original output (text, suffix array, LCP array) only occupies  bytes. Rather than the actual LCP array, this algorithm builds the permuted LCP (PLCP) array, in which the values appear in text order rather than lexicographical order.

 provide two algorithms that although being theoretically slow were faster than the above-mentioned algorithms in practice.

Applications 
As noted by  several string processing problems can be solved by the following kinds of tree traversals:

 bottom-up traversal of the complete suffix tree
 top-down traversal of a subtree of the suffix tree
 suffix tree traversal using the suffix links.

 show how to simulate a bottom-up traversal of the suffix tree using only the suffix array and LCP array.  enhance the suffix array with the LCP array and additional data structures and describe how this enhanced suffix array can be used to simulate all three kinds of suffix tree traversals.  reduce the space requirements of the enhanced suffix array by preprocessing the LCP array for range minimum queries. Thus,  every problem that can be solved by suffix tree algorithms can also be solved using the enhanced suffix array.

Deciding if a pattern  of length  is a substring of a string  of length  takes  time if only the suffix array is used. By additionally using the LCP information, this bound can be improved to  time.  show how to improve this running time even further to achieve optimal  time. Thus, using suffix array and LCP array information, the decision query can be answered as fast as using the suffix tree.

The LCP array is also an essential part of compressed suffix trees which provide full suffix tree functionality like suffix links and lowest common ancestor queries. Furthermore, it can be used together with the suffix array to compute the Lempel-Ziv LZ77 factorization in  time.

The longest repeated substring problem for a string  of length  can be solved in  time using both the suffix array  and the LCP array. It is sufficient to perform a linear scan through the LCP array in order to find its maximum value  and the corresponding index  where  is stored.

The remainder of this section explains two applications of the LCP array in more detail: How the suffix array and the LCP array of a string can be used to construct the corresponding suffix tree and how it is possible to answer LCP queries for arbitrary suffixes using range minimum queries on the LCP array.

Find the number of occurrences of a pattern 

In order to find the number of occurrences of a given string  (length ) in a text  (length ),

 Now to speed up the search, we use LCP  array, specifically a special version of the LCP array (LCP-LR below).

The issue with using standard binary search (without the LCP information) is that in each of the  comparisons needed to be made, we compare P to the current entry of the suffix array, which means a full string comparison of up to m characters.

At any point during the binary search algorithm, we consider, as usual, a range  of the suffix array and its central point , and decide whether we continue our search in the left sub-range  or in the right sub-range . So, in the next step, we consider  and a new central point  in the middle:

              M ...... M' ...... R
              |
       we know:
          lcp(P,M)==k

We already know (from the previous step) that  itself has a prefix of  characters in common with : . Now there are three possibilities:

 Case 1: , i.e.  has fewer prefix characters in common with M than M has in common with M'. This means the (k+1)-th character of M' is the same as that of M, and since P is lexicographically larger than M, it must be lexicographically larger than M', too. So we continue in the right half (M',...,R).
 Case 3: . To decide whether we continue in the left or right half, it suffices to compare  to  starting from the th character.
 We continue recursively.

We still need to precompute LCP-LR so it is able to tell us in  time the lcp between any two entries of the suffix array. We know the standard LCP array gives us the lcp of consecutive entries only, i.e.  for any .

Another way of looking at it is : every entry of the suffix array occurs as central point of exactly one possible range during binary search.

Moreover, there is a straightforward recursive algorithm to compute the  values of LCP-LR in  time from the standard LCP array.

To sum up:

 It is possible to compute LCP-LR in  time and  space from LCP.

Suffix tree construction 
Given the suffix array  and the LCP array  of a string  of length , its suffix tree  can be constructed in  time based on the following idea: Start with the partial suffix tree for the lexicographically smallest suffix and repeatedly insert the other suffixes in the order given by the suffix array.

We need to distinguish two cases:

Thus the edge label consists of the remaining characters of suffix  that are not already represented by the concatenation of the labels of the root-to- path. This creates the partial suffix tree . 

 Delete the edge .
 Add a new internal node  and a new edge  with label .
 Connect  to the newly created internal node  by an edge  that is labeled . The new label consists of the remaining characters of the deleted edge  that were not used as the label of edge .
 Add  as a new leaf  and connect it to the new internal node  by an edge  that is labeled . Thus the edge label consists of the remaining characters of suffix  that are not already represented by the concatenation of the labels of the root-to- path.
 This creates the partial suffix tree .

A simple amortization argument shows that the running time of this algorithm is bounded by :

These nodes will never be traversed again for all subsequent steps . Therefore, at most  nodes will be traversed in total.

LCP queries for arbitrary suffixes 
The LCP array  only contains the length of the longest common prefix of every pair of consecutive suffixes in the suffix array .

Because of the lexicographic order of the suffix array, every common prefix of the suffixes  and  has to be a common prefix of all suffixes between 's position in the suffix array  and 's position in the suffix array . Therefore, the length of the longest prefix that is shared by all of these suffixes is the minimum value in the interval . This value can be found in constant time if  is preprocessed for range minimum queries.

Notes

References

External links

Mirror of the ad-hoc-implementation of the code described in 
SDSL: Succinct Data Structure Library - Provides various LCP array implementations, Range Minimum Query (RMQ) support structures and many more succinct data structures 
Bottom-up suffix tree traversal emulated using suffix array and LCP array (Java)
Text-Indexing project (linear-time construction of suffix trees, suffix arrays, LCP array and Burrows–Wheeler Transform)

Arrays
Substring indices
String data structures